Fleury is a French masculine given name and  surname. It is the masculine form of fleur ('flower'). Notable people with the name include:

Given name
 Fleury Di Nallo (born 1943), French former footballer
 Fleury Linossier (1902–?), French painter
 Fleury Marius (1896–1972), French aviator
 Fleury Mesplet (1734–1794), French-Canadian printer, founder of the Montreal Gazette newspaper
 Fleury François Richard (1777–1852), French painter

Surname
 Amber Fleury (born 1979), a contestant on Canadian Idol
 André Fleury (organist) (1903–1995), French composer, pianist, organist and pedagogue
 André-Hercule de Fleury (1653-1743), chief minister of Louis XV
 Antoine-Claude Fleury (1743–1822), French historical and portrait painter
 Charles Fleury (c. 1605–1652), French lutenist
 Claude Fleury (1640–1723), French ecclesiastical historian
 Eleanora Fleury (1860–1940), first female medical graduate of the Royal University of Ireland
 Émery Fleury (1901–1975), Canadian politician
 Fanny Fleury (1848–1920), French painter
 Gordon A. Fleury, American politician
 Haydn Fleury (born 1996), Canadian National Hockey League player
 Jean Fleury (died 1527), French naval officer and privateer
 Jean-Gérard Fleury (1905–2002), French businessman, aviator, journalist and writer
 Lionel Fleury (1912–1997), Canadian ice hockey administrator
 Louis Fleury (1878–1926), French flautist
 Luiz Antônio Fleury Filho (1949–2022), Brazilian politician
 Marc Fleury (born 1968), French software developer
 Marc-André Fleury (born 1984), Canadian National Hockey League player
 Mathieu Fleury (born 1985), Canadian politician
 Michel Fleury (1923–2002), French archaeologist, archivist and historian
 Michelle Fleury, British journalist
 Pat Fleury (born 1956), Irish former hurler
 Paul A. Fleury (born 1939), American physicist and academic administrator
 Sérgio Paranhos Fleury (1933–1979), Brazilian police official
 Sylvie Fleury (born 1961), Swiss pop artist
 Theoren Fleury (born 1968), Canadian former National Hockey League player
 Tracy Fleury (born 1986), Canadian curler

Mononym 
 Abraham-Joseph Bénard (1750–1822), known as Fleury, a French actor and comedian
 Mademoiselle Fleury (Marie-Anne-Florence Bernardy-Nones, 1766–1818), a Belgian actress in France

See also

 Joseph-Nicolas Robert-Fleury (1797–1890), French painter
 De Fleury, a list of people with the surname

French masculine given names
Surnames from nicknames